Vincent Grady O'Malley  (born April 25, 1948) is a retired American professional basketball forward and a long-serving assistant United States attorney.

He was the 214th overall selection in the 19th round by the Atlanta Hawks in the 1969 National Basketball Association draft. He played in 24 games in his NBA career, and averaged 2.1 points per game and 1.1 rebounds per game. He was waived by the Hawks on February 1, 1970 after the team acquired Walt Bellamy from the Detroit Pistons. Prior to playing in the NBA, he starred at Manhattan College. He was inducted into the Manhattan College Hall of Fame in 2007.

Following his brief stint in the NBA, O'Malley attended law school and is currently an assistant United States attorney for the District of New Jersey.

Education 
O'Malley graduated with a bachelor of arts degree in political science from Manhattan College's College of Arts and Sciences in 1969. O'Malley graduated on the Dean's List. Following his year playing on the Atlanta Hawks, O'Malley attended Boston College School of Law in Newton, Massachusetts, where he worked with Professor Robert Berry to develop the nation's first sports law course. O'Malley obtained his Juris Doctor from Boston College School of Law in 1973.

Legal career 
O'Malley began his long career in criminal prosecution and public service at the Bronx County District Attorney's office. He served as an assistant district attorney in the Bronx, N.Y. from 1973 to 1977.

In 1977, O'Malley began working at the U.S. Attorney's office for the District of New Jersey in Newark, N.J. as a special attorney in the Organized Crime Strike Force. He became an assistant United States attorney in 1990 when Attorney General Richard Thornberg joined the strike forces with the U.S. Attorney's Office.

O'Malley tried his first case at the U.S. Attorney's office in March 1977 and since has tried well over 120 federal jury trials. O'Malley has had only three acquittals in his long tenure. The vast majority of O'Malley's trial work has been in the area of organized crime and labor racketeering. His first notable trial was the conviction of Hugo Germer, et al. in 1979, for the multimillion-dollar advanced fee scheme. Another significant conviction was that of James Paone, Secretary Treasurer of Local 863 Teamsters Union and Thomas Pecora, nephew of mob boss Tommy Pecora and General Manager of Federico Trucking, on two RICO counts, in 1982.

Most notably, O'Malley lead the prosecution of the longest running federal criminal trial in U.S. history. In 1985, O'Malley filed two significant indictments. The first, an organized crime drug conspiracy by ten associates of crime boss Anthony Accetturo, U.S. v. DiNorscio, Cohen, et al., was tried in 1986 before the Honorable Mary Ann Trump Berry and resulted in convictions of all eight defendants. Lead defendants, Giacomo "Jackie" DiNorscio and Gerald Cohen each received 30 year sentences. The second indictment filed in 1985 was a wide-ranging RICO indictment of 24 members of the Acceturo crime family. This trial began in the fall of 1986 and lasted 22 months until September 1988, surpassing the Southern District of New York "Pizza Connection" trial as the longest federal criminal trial in the nation's history. All 19 defendants in the trial were acquitted after the jury deliberated for 14 hours. Five years later in 2003, Michael Taccetta and Michael Perna, who of the lead defendants in the trial, pleaded guilty to jury tampering in the Accetturo trial, along with other violations. For the remaining two years of the 1980s, O'Malley continued to charge and convict many of the defendants who were acquitted during the Accetturo trial on other charges, eventually convicting every one of the acquitted defendants. This trial is the subject of the 2006 American film "Find Me Guilty," which was co-written and directed by Sidney Lumet and stars Vin Diesel.

During the 1990s, O'Malley shifted focus from traditional organized street crime cases to more union related fraud and corruption. Since this time, O'Malley has become widely regarded as a preeminent prosecutor of labor racketeering, employee benefit, and health care fraud. In 1995 he tried and convicted Joseph and Raymond LaBarck, President and Vice President of Local 1733 of the Amalgamated Clothing and Textile Workers Union, for operating the union as a criminal enterprise and for using their positions to extort millions of dollars from at least a dozen employers in the printers and dyers industry. The conviction of the LaBarcks liberated an entire industry and, in conjunction with other convictions, earned O'Malley the first of his two Director's Awards in 1998.

Another of O'Malley's groundbreaking cases came in April 2000, when he tried the first federal computer sabotage case. In this case, Tim Lloyd was charged with planting a computer "time bomb" in the central file server of Omega Engineering's computer network while he was employed by Omega, and then detonating it after he was fired from the company. Next, in July 2006 O'Malley co-chaired the trial of Roger Duronio, who was convicted of securities and computer fraud after a six-week trial. Duronio was a disgruntled mid-level computer administrator for UBS, who released a "logic bomb" upon the bank's system and cause catastrophic damage to the company.

Resuming his focus upon union related corruption, O'Malley successfully convicted the entire executive board of Local 1588 of the International Longshoremen's Association, including organized crime associate Joseph Lore, of conspiracy to embezzle and the embezzlement of union funds. Next, O'Malley tried and convicted Joseph Nardone Sr. and Joseph Nardone Jr., the former and current presidents of Local 148 of the Novelty Production Workers Union, and others, for embezzling almost a million dollars through phony construction projects. This latter effort resulted in O'Malley's second Director's Award in 2005.

O'Malley was promoted to chief of the Organized Crime Strike Force in 2006 by Chris Christie and served in that position until 2010.

O'Malley also convicted an employer-subcontractor, and eight co-defendants, of conspiracy to extort wage kickbacks from employees on a federally funded construction project at Fort Dix in New Jersey, in violation of the Anti-Wage Kickback Act of 1934 or the "Copeland Act".  The investigation of this case also uncovered the attempted murder of the General Contractor's site manager for his hyper-vigilance of Sands Mechanical, which caused three co-defendants to travel from Pennsylvania to New Jersey in violation of the Travel Act to run him down while he was cycling. O'Malley was awarded the United States Department of Labor's Prosecutor of the Year Award for his work on this case in 2014.

More recently, O'Malley tried and convicted Richard Dressel, business manager for the Local 164 International Brotherhood of Electrical Workers union, for embezzling union and Employee Retirement Income Security Act fund monies and Paul Moe, Sr. of the International Longshoremen's Association for wire fraud charges in connection with his employment at APM Terminals in Elizabeth, N.J.

O'Malley continues to serve as senior litigation counsel at the U.S. Attorney's office in Newark, N.J. and is one of the longest serving federal prosecutors in the country.

References

External links
Stats at basketball-reference.com

1948 births
Living people
American men's basketball players
Assistant United States Attorneys
Atlanta Hawks draft picks
Atlanta Hawks players
Basketball players from Boston
Manhattan Jaspers basketball players
Small forwards